Adilson Vaz (born 29 October 1988), commonly known as Vaz, is a Cape Verdean footballer who plays for C.D.C. Montalegre.

Career

Montalegre
In July 2019 it was confirmed, that Vaz had joined C.D.C. Montalegre.

References

External links

1988 births
Living people
Cape Verdean footballers
Sertanense F.C. players
C.D. Aves players
Gondomar S.C. players
C.D. Santa Clara players
G.D. Gafanha players
AD Fafe players
C.D. Trofense players
S.C. Olhanense players
C.D.C. Montalegre players
Campeonato de Portugal (league) players
Liga Portugal 2 players
Primeira Liga players
Cape Verdean expatriate footballers
Cape Verdean expatriate sportspeople in Portugal
Expatriate footballers in Portugal
Association football defenders